Three Hams on Rye is a 1950 short subject directed by Jules White starring American slapstick comedy team The Three Stooges (Moe Howard, Larry Fine and Shemp Howard). It is the 125th entry in the series released by Columbia Pictures starring the comedians, who released 190 shorts for the studio between 1934 and 1959.

Plot
The Stooges are stage hands who also have small parts in the production of "The Bride Wore Spurs." They quickly get on the bad side of their producer, B. K. Doaks (Emil Sitka), who has had his last several plays panned by famous critic Nick Barker (Ned Glass) and wants to put on a good show with what he has. In order to prevent Barker from getting in to see the play, he commissions the boys to stop him from sneaking in, which they fail to do as a result of their confusing disguises (they end up attacking each other and B.K.).

B.K. reprimands the Stooges and demands they get the props ready for the final act (a cake and a salad), but Moe is reminded that he forgot to go shopping for them. It is also late at night and the stores are closed, so the Stooges have to whip up a cake and salad for the act to appease B.K. and save the show. However, as the cake is being prepared, Shemp accidentally tosses a pot holder onto a cake pan, resulting in Moe unintentionally adding it into the cake.

As the final scene commences, the Stooges and a number of other bit actors, as Southern Gentlemen, all propose to "Janie Belle" (Christine McIntyre) at once, and she proposes a contest; whoever eats the most of her cake gets her hand in marriage. However, the cake is difficult to eat as a result of the pot holder, and after ingesting their pieces, all the actors begin coughing up feathers, causing all in attendance to start laughing uproariously.

B.K. is mortified and cues the curtain down, and as the Stooges drink copious amounts of punch to quell the feathers in their mouths, a furious B.K. tears into them and fires them on the spot. However, in a reversal of fortunes, Barker thinks the play is a hilarious satire and commends the Stooges' performance before asking to see B.K.'s next work. B.K. then claims that the next work will star the Stooges as the main roles, and the boys finally get a break.

Cast

Credited
 Moe Howard as Moe
 Larry Fine as Larry
 Shemp Howard as Shemp
 Emil Sitka as B. K. Doaks
 Christine McIntyre as Janie Belle
 Nanette Bordeaux as Lula Belle

Uncredited
 Ned Glass as Nick Barker
 Danny Lewis as Shorter actor
 Judy Malcolm as Brunette showgirl
 Brian O'Hara as Taller actor
 Mildred Olsen as Blonde showgirl
 Blackie Whiteford as Stagehand

Production notes
The plot device of the coughing up feathers due to a misplaced potholder was borrowed from 1935's Uncivil Warriors. Three Hams on Rye is the fourteenth of sixteen Stooge shorts with the word "three" in the title.

Three Hams On Rye was filmed on December 14–16, 1948 but withheld from release until September 7, 1950. The 630 days between filming and releasing the short are the longest for any Shemp film released as a member of the team, Love at First Bite coming in second at 620 days.

Danny Lewis has appeared in one other Three Stooges short and also Danny was father of actor Jerry Lewis. According to Director Jules White, he swallowed a feather during filming.

Three Hams On Rye marks the final appearance of longtime co-star actors Ned Glass and Brian O Hara. The two actors were making their final appearance in short film.

References

External links 
 
 

1950 films
1950 comedy films
The Three Stooges films
American black-and-white films
Films directed by Jules White
Columbia Pictures short films
American comedy short films
1950s English-language films
1950s American films